The 39th CARIFTA Games was held in the Truman Bodden Sports Complex in George Town, Cayman Islands, on April 3–5, 2010.  A detailed
report on the results was given.

Records

In total, 13 new games records were set.

Key

Austin Sealy Award

The Austin Sealy Trophy for the
most outstanding athlete of the games was awarded to Jehue Gordon of
Trinidad and Tobago.   He won two gold medals in the 110 m
hurdles and the 400 m hurdles
competition in the
junior (U-20) category setting new games record in both events,
and a bronze medal with
the 4 × 400 m relay team of Trinidad and Tobago.

Medal summary

Medal winners and 
complete results can be found on the CFPI Timing website, and on the World Junior Athletics History website.

Boys under 20 (Junior)

: Open event for both junior and youth athletes.

Girls under 20 (Junior)

: Open event for both junior and youth athletes.

Boys under 17 (Youth)

Girls under 17 (Youth)

: Exhibition event.

Medal table (unofficial)

An (official) medal count was published. However, there are a couple of mismatches to the unofficial count as displayed above
  The official count does not contain the results (gold for Dominica, silver for Martinique, bronze for Jamaica) for the girls' U-17 javelin throw which is dubbed as "exhibition event".
  The official count displays 8 bronze medals for Bermuda, but only one bronze medal for Guadeloupe.  This is not reflected in the results.
  The official count displays 37 gold and 13 bronze medals for Jamaica.  If this was correct, there would be 66 gold medals, 65 silver medals, and 64 bronze medals in total (disregarding the results for the girls U-17 javelin throw).  Again, there is no evidence for this in the results.

Participation (unofficial)

Detailed result lists can be found on the CFPI Timing, and on the World Junior Athletics History website.  An unofficial count yields the number of about 427 athletes (234 junior (under-20) and 193 youth (under-17)) from about 24 countries:

 (3)
 (5)
 (5)
 (68)
 (34)
 (20)
 (8)
 (27)
 (9)
 (8)
/ (14)
 (8)
 (4)
 (70)
/ (21)
 (4)
 (11)
 (7)
 (16)
 (3)
 (5)
 (66)
 (7)
 (4)

References

External links
C.F.P.I. Timing & Data, Inc.
World Junior Athletics History

CARIFTA Games
2010 in Caymanian sport
CARIFTA
International sports competitions hosted by the Cayman Islands
2010 in Caribbean sport
Athletics competitions in the Cayman Islands